Clara Pierre Impens (21 February 1899 – 16 August 1970) was a Belgian soprano who sang under the stage-name Clara Clairbert.

Early life
Born in Saint Gilles, Clara began studying music in Anderlecht at the age of seven. During the First World War her father, a civil servant, followed the Belgian government into exile, settling his family in Le Havre. There, Clara sang in a Belgian choir, coming to the attention of choir-master  who arranged for Clara to be trained as a soloist in Paris.

After the war, she appeared regularly at benefit concerts for Belgian veterans and war wounded throughout Belgium, singing under the name Clary Annie. This brought her to the attention to the director of La Monnaie.

Career
She first sang at La Monnaie in a production of Offenbach's Les contes d'Hoffmann. Taking the stage-name Clara Clairbert, she was considered the prima donna of opera in Brussels from the 1920s to her retirement in the 1950s.

Her performances as Violetta in La traviata, a role she reprised over 200 times, and as the eponymous heroine of Lakmé were particularly popular. She toured regularly abroad with success, her appearances in Manon in Monte-Carlo in 1931, and in Rigoletto at the Opera Garnier in Paris in 1933, were particularly well received. She toured the United States, performing opposite John Charles Thomas and Beniamino Gigli.

She retired in 1953 to teach music privately. She died in Brussels in 1970.

References
 Moors, Hans, "IMPENS, Clara, Pierre..." in E. Gubin, C. Jacques, V. Piette & J. Puissant (eds), Dictionnaire des femmes belges: XIXe et XXe siècles. Bruxelles: Éditions Racine, 2006. 

1899 births
1970 deaths
Belgian operatic sopranos
20th-century Belgian women opera singers
People from Saint-Gilles, Belgium